Joshua Carr (born 29 April 1980) is a former Australian rules footballer who played for the Port Adelaide Football Club and Fremantle Football Club in the Australian Football League (AFL). He was drafted by the Port Adelaide Football Club in the 1998 AFL Draft and made his debut for the club in 2000. After playing in the Power's 2004 premiership side, he returned to Western Australia in 2005 to play for the Fremantle Football Club, where he played alongside his elder brother Matthew Carr for four seasons. He returned to Port Adelaide in 2009 and played a further two seasons before retiring at the end of the 2010 season.

After his retirement, Carr continued on with the Power as an assistant coach between 2011 and 2015. He then coached SANFL club  from 2016 to 2019, leading the club to the SANFL premiership in 2018. In October 2019, he re-joined Fremantle as an assistant coach for the 2020 season.

AFL career

Port Adelaide career (1999–2004)
In his first season, he did not play a game due to injury. In 2001 he became one of Port's key players, winning the best team man award. In 2004 he was appointed Vice Captain alongside Warren Tredrea. He played in the 2004 Port Adelaide premiership team before announcing he wanted to join Fremantle in 2005 to play alongside brother Matthew Carr.

Fremantle career (2005–2008) 
Port eventually traded him and he returned to Western Australia at the beginning of the 2005 season.

Carr was named as Fremantle's vice-captain for the 2007 & 2008 seasons. He won the Ross Glendinning medal in the second Western Derby of 2007, gathering 26 possessions and kicking three goals as Fremantle notched up their eighth win over West Coast.

During the 2008 he began to question his career at Fremantle due to his brothers retirement. At the end of the 2008 season, Carr told the club that he wanted to be traded back to Port Adelaide for personal reasons. He played 83 games for Fremantle in four seasons.

Return to Port Adelaide (2009–2010)
He was drafted at number 2 by the Power in the 2008 Pre-Season Draft and played his 200th AFL game against Carlton in round 20, 2009.

On 19 July 2010, Carr announced he would retire following Showdown XXIX at AAMI Stadium. He ended his career in a 19-point win, marking an impressive 10–0 record in Showdowns.

Coaching career
Between 2011 and 2015, Carr served as an assistant coach for Port Adelaide. Between 2016 and 2019, he served as senior coach of the North Adelaide Roosters in the SANFL, guiding the club to the premiership in 2018.

In October 2019, Carr was appointed by Fremantle as an assistant coach for the 2020 season. On July 30, 2021, the club announced that Carr had been stood down for an unstated period after he was fined by police for breaching WA quarantine restrictions.

Playing statistics

|-
|- style="background-color: #EAEAEA"
! scope="row" style="text-align:center" | 2000
|style="text-align:center;"|
| 25 || 14 || 2 || 3 || 115 || 58 || 173 || 39 || 21 || 0.1 || 0.2 || 8.2 || 4.1 || 12.4 || 2.8 || 1.5
|-
! scope="row" style="text-align:center" | 2001
|style="text-align:center;"|
| 25 || 24 || 18 || 9 || 266 || 124 || 390 || 108 || 55 || 0.8 || 0.4 || 11.1 || 5.2 || 16.3 || 4.5 || 2.3
|- style="background-color: #EAEAEA"
! scope="row" style="text-align:center" | 2002
|style="text-align:center;"|
| 9 || 25 || 13 || 11 || 263 || 151 || 414 || 88 || 73 || 0.5 || 0.4 || 10.5 || 6.0 || 16.6 || 3.5 || 2.9
|-
! scope="row" style="text-align:center" | 2003
|style="text-align:center;"|
| 9 || 23 || 16 || 13 || 296 || 130 || 426 || 90 || 69 || 0.7 || 0.6 || 12.9 || 5.7 || 18.5 || 3.9 || 3.0
|- style="background-color: #EAEAEA"
! scope="row" style="text-align:center;" | 2004
|style="text-align:center;"|
| 9 || 19 || 11 || 6 || 195 || 161 || 356 || 65 || 58 || 0.6 || 0.3 || 10.3 || 8.5 || 18.7 || 3.4 || 3.1
|-
! scope="row" style="text-align:center" | 2005
|style="text-align:center;"|
| 2 || 22 || 12 || 7 || 269 || 175 || 444 || 81 || 86 || 0.5 || 0.3 || 12.2 || 8.0 || 20.2 || 3.7 || 3.9
|- style="background-color: #EAEAEA"
! scope="row" style="text-align:center" | 2006
|style="text-align:center;"|
| 2 || 23 || 7 || 9 || 252 || 229 || 481 || 129 || 88 || 0.3 || 0.4 || 11.0 || 10.0 || 20.9 || 5.6 || 3.8
|-
! scope="row" style="text-align:center" | 2007
|style="text-align:center;"|
| 2 || 20 || 14 || 6 || 248 || 171 || 419 || 102 || 79 || 0.7 || 0.3 || 12.4 || 8.6 || 21.0 || 5.1 || 4.0
|- style="background-color: #EAEAEA"
! scope="row" style="text-align:center" | 2008
|style="text-align:center;"|
| 2 || 18 || 11 || 4 || 163 || 140 || 303 || 64 || 84 || 0.6 || 0.2 || 9.1 || 7.8 || 16.8 || 3.6 || 4.7
|-
! scope="row" style="text-align:center" | 2009
|style="text-align:center;"|
| 2 || 12 || 4 || 1 || 70 || 102 || 172 || 37 || 45 || 0.3 || 0.1 || 5.8 || 8.5 || 14.3 || 3.1 || 3.8
|- style="background-color: #EAEAEA"
! scope="row" style="text-align:center" | 2010
|style="text-align:center;"|
| 2 || 7 || 1 || 1 || 56 || 51 || 107 || 22 || 25 || 0.1 || 0.1 || 8.0 || 7.3 || 15.3 || 3.1 || 3.6
|- class="sortbottom"
! colspan=3| Career
! 207
! 109
! 70
! 2193
! 1492
! 3685
! 825
! 683
! 0.5
! 0.3
! 10.6
! 7.2
! 17.8
! 4.0
! 3.3
|}

References

External links

1980 births
Living people
Fremantle Football Club players
Port Adelaide Football Club players
Port Adelaide Football Club Premiership players
Port Adelaide Football Club players (all competitions)
East Fremantle Football Club players
People educated at Corpus Christi College, Perth
Australian rules footballers from Western Australia
People from Goomalling, Western Australia
One-time VFL/AFL Premiership players